The Ogdensburg–Prescott International Bridge (also known as the St. Lawrence Bridge and the Seaway Skyway) is a suspension bridge connecting Ogdensburg, New York in the United States to Johnstown, Ontario (a few kilometres east of Prescott) in Canada. The bridge is owned and operated by the Ogdensburg Bridge and Port Authority, which also owns and operates Ogdensburg International Airport, the Port of Ogdensburg-Marine Terminal Facility, Commerce Park, the Port of Waddington, a medium-heavy industrial park and two short line railroads. The Ogdensburg Bridge and Port Authority is a New York State public-benefit corporation.

Accessibility 
The Ogdensburg–Prescott International Bridge allows for both passenger and commercial vehicles to cross the Canada-United States border; neither cyclists nor pedestrians are permitted to cross this bridge. The bridge is a very popular border crossing for passenger vehicles due to its proximity to Ottawa on the Canadian side, with 410,000 vehicles crossing in 2011 alone. The bridge was designed for heavy loads and has a weight capacity of 105,000 pounds. The weight limit easily accommodates semi-trailer trucks. This bridge, however, does not see as much commercial traffic as the nearby Thousand Islands Bridge, as it is not a direct route to any US interstate highway.

On the Canadian side, the bridge connects to Highway 16, a highway which interchanges with Highway 401 and Highway 416 that continues north to Ottawa.

On the US side, the bridge connects to New York State Route 812, which connects with New York State Route 37 a few blocks from the southern end. Route 812 joins Route 37 west into Ogdensburg. It then goes south to Village of Lowville in Lewis County. Route 37 continues west to a fork at Morristown, N.Y. where Route 12 picks up to Alexandria Bay and Interstate 81.

Border crossing

The Ogdensburg–Prescott Border Crossing connects the cities of Ogdensburg, New York and Johnstown, Ontario at the Ogdensburg–Prescott International Bridge. The US border inspection station was built in 1960. The inspection canopy was replaced, and the building significantly upgraded and expanded in 2004.  The Canada border station was replaced in 2012.

Events 
On 1 September 2015, the Ogdensburg–Prescott International Bridge made headlines after Prime Minister Stephen Harper posted a video to his Facebook page standing in front of the bridge and the Port of Johnstown. The video was supposed to be a congratulatory video about the shipbuilding industry in the Halifax harbour in Halifax, Nova Scotia, however upon its release, locals of Halifax noticed inconsistencies with the scenery compared to that of the Halifax harbour and began to question where the video was actually shot. By 5 September, viewers had determined the video was actually shot in Johnstown, Ontario based on the quick shot of the port in the background, which was unmistakably the Port of Johnstown. Viewers then accused Harper of trying to pass off the scenery as the Halifax harbour due to the undeniable similarities between the Ogdensburg-Prescott bridge and the A. Murray MacKay Bridge in the Halifax harbour.

See also

 New York and Ogdensburg Railway, owned by the Bridge & Port Authority
 List of crossings of the Saint Lawrence River
 Port Authority of New York and New Jersey
 Toronto Harbour Commission - which purchased two car ferries in 1960 – Maple City (1951) and Windmill Point (1954) – that originally served Ogdensburg and Prescott
 List of bridges in Canada

Other suspension bridges in Ontario:

 Sewells Road Suspension Bridge
 Ambassador Bridge
 Thousand Islands Bridge
 Buffalo and Fort Erie Public Bridge Authority
 Niagara Falls Bridge Commission

References

External links

 The Ogdensburg Bridge and Port Authority
 Entry at bridgemeister.com
 

Suspension bridges in New York (state)
Suspension bridges in Canada
Road bridges in Ontario
Canada–United States bridges
Buildings and structures in Leeds and Grenville United Counties
Bridges completed in 1960
Bridges over the Saint Lawrence River
Road bridges in New York (state)
Transport in Leeds and Grenville United Counties
Toll bridges in New York (state)
Toll bridges in Canada
Public benefit corporations
Public benefit corporations in New York (state)
1960 establishments in New York (state)
1960 establishments in Ontario
Port authorities in the United States